Zbigniew Kiernikowski (born 2 July 1946 in Szamarzewo) is a Polish prelate of the Catholic Church who was bishop of Legnica from 2014 to 2021 and of Siedlice from 2002 to 2014.

Biography
Kiernikowski was ordained to the priesthood on 6 June 1971.

He completed a dissertation in Theology in 1983 at the Pontifical University of Saint Thomas Aquinas, Angelicum titled La crescita della comunità, Corpo di Cristo : l'identità e il dinamismo della vita cristiana rispecchiate nella dinamica del testo della Lettera ai Colossesi.

Kiernikowski was named bishop of Siedlce, Poland, on 28 March 2002. On 16 April 2014, he was named bishop of Legnica.

Pope Francis accepted his resignation on 28 June 2021, following his investigation by the Vatican into his negligence in a sexual abuse case.

Honors and awards

National awards
 :
 Knight's Cross of the Order of Polonia Restituta (2009)

References

1946 births
Living people
People from Września County
Pontifical University of Saint Thomas Aquinas alumni
21st-century Roman Catholic bishops in Poland